Victor Hugo Mateus Golas (born 27 December 1990) is a Brazilian professional footballer who plays as a goalkeeper for Associação Atlética Internacional (Limeira).

Club career
Born in Arapongas, Paraná of Polish descent, Golas joined Sporting CP in 2007, aged just 16. During his first three seasons as a senior he was loaned to Real SC, Boavista F.C. and F.C. Penafiel, making his professional debut with the latter club on 4 September 2011 in a 3–2 away win against C.F. União in the Segunda Liga.

Returned to Lisbon in the summer of 2012, Golas was exclusively associated with the reserve side also in the second division. Released in June 2014, he signed with S.C. Braga. His input with their first team consisted of one game, the 2–0 victory over Rio Ave F.C. on 4 February 2015 in the group stage of the Taça da Liga.

Golas moved to PFC Botev Plovdiv from Bulgaria on 3 August 2015. His first match in the First Professional Football League occurred six days later, in a 1–0 win at OFC Pirin Blagoevgrad. On 3 July 2016, after making 31 competitive appearances, he was released.

In the following years, save for a brief spell in the Football Superleague of Kosovo with KF Trepça '89, Golas played in his country's lower leagues. In June 2021, he signed with Lithuanian club FK Panevėžys.

References

External links

1990 births
Living people
People from Arapongas
Brazilian people of Polish descent
Sportspeople from Paraná (state)
Brazilian footballers
Association football goalkeepers
Campeonato Brasileiro Série D players
Clube Atlético Linense players
Londrina Esporte Clube players
Maringá Futebol Clube players
Clube Náutico Marcílio Dias players
Rio Claro Futebol Clube players
Associação Atlética Internacional (Limeira) players
Liga Portugal 2 players
Segunda Divisão players
Sporting CP footballers
Real S.C. players
Boavista F.C. players
F.C. Penafiel players
Sporting CP B players
S.C. Braga B players
S.C. Braga players
First Professional Football League (Bulgaria) players
Botev Plovdiv players
Football Superleague of Kosovo players
KF Trepça'89 players
Saudi First Division League players
Khaleej FC players
A Lyga players
FK Panevėžys players
Brazilian expatriate footballers
Expatriate footballers in Portugal
Expatriate footballers in Bulgaria
Expatriate footballers in Kosovo
Expatriate footballers in Saudi Arabia
Expatriate footballers in Lithuania
Brazilian expatriate sportspeople in Portugal
Brazilian expatriate sportspeople in Bulgaria
Brazilian expatriate sportspeople in Kosovo
Brazilian expatriate sportspeople in Saudi Arabia
Brazilian expatriate sportspeople in Lithuania